László Pintér (born 6 December 1983 in Szolnok) is a Hungarian football player who currently plays for Kaposvári Rákóczi FC.

References
Player profile at HLSZ 

1983 births
Living people
People from Szolnok
Hungarian footballers
Association football defenders
Szolnoki MÁV FC footballers
Kaposvári Rákóczi FC players
Kaposvölgye VSC footballers
Sportspeople from Jász-Nagykun-Szolnok County